Robin Koval (born May 25, 1955) is a New York Times best-selling author  and CEO and president of Truth Initiative 
, a nonprofit tobacco control organization best known for its Truth youth smoking prevention campaign. Koval also co-founded The Kaplan Thaler Group and later served as the CEO of Publicis Kaplan Thaler (now Publicis New York), New York’s fifth largest  advertising agency through November 2013.

Early life and education
Koval is a native New Yorker, and has trained as a figure skater. She graduated from Syracuse University with a Bachelor of Fine Arts degree.  She later earned her Master of Business Administration from Baruch College.

Career
Throughout her career, Koval served as a marketing strategist and new products expert. She has worked with clients across several categories, ranging from beauty and beverages to distilled spirits and pharmaceuticals. Koval served as executive vice president of Interpublic's Gotham, Inc. and in 1997 she co-founded the Kaplan Thaler Group with her partner, Linda Kaplan Thaler.

In July 2012, the Kaplan Thaler Group merged with Publicis New York to form Publicis Kaplan Thaler, where Robin served as CEO.  The Kaplan Thaler Group, and later Publicis Kaplan Thaler, were responsible for the "Yes, Yes, Yes" Herbal Essences campaign and for the creation of the Aflac duck campaign.  Other clients of the Kaplan Thaler Group include Procter & Gamble, L'Oreal, Champion, Edmunds, NAPA Auto Parts, Pfizer, SuperValu, U.S. Bank and Wendy's.

In 2013, Koval was named chief executive officer and president of Truth Initiative.

Before moving to Washington, D.C., Koval served on the faculty of New York University as an adjunct professor in the Steinhardt School of Culture, Education, and Human Development.

Publications and Appearances 
Koval has authored four best-selling titles with coauthor and former business partner Linda Kaplan Thaler:
 Grit to Great: How Perseverance, Passion, and Pluck Take You from Ordinary to Extraordinary (2015)
 The Power of Small: Why Little Things Make All the Difference (2009)
 The Power of Nice: How to Conquer the Business World with Kindness (2006)
 Bang!: Getting Your Message Heard in a Noisy World (2003)
Koval regularly appears on television, contributes commentary to print and online outlets and speaks at conferences and colloquia for business, government and media audiences, including the Aspen Ideas Festival.  Her guest television appearances have included NBC's "Today," "The Martha Stewart Show," as well as ABC's "Good Morning America" and "Nightline."

Achievements and Honors 
During her time at Kaplan Thaler Group and Publicis Kaplan Thaler, Koval assisted with activities at pro-social and cause-related organizations, including the Girl Scouts' "Girls Go Tech" campaign that encouraged young girls to go into STEM disciplines.  She also supported initiatives from the Make-A-Wish Foundation and the American Red Cross.

In September 2012, Koval was named by Advertising Age as one of the 100 Most Influential Women in Advertising.  She is also the recipient of a 2011 New York Women in Communications Matrix Award and a 2011 Women's Venture Fund Highest Leaf Award.  In 2008, she was named one of Self-Made Magazine's top 50 "Women Entrepreneurs Who Inspire," as well as one of the top 20 female entrepreneurs in the U.S. by Blogtrepreneur.com  In November 2008, Koval was presented with the Women's Leadership Exchange Compass Award and, in January 2007, she was honored with the Advertising Women of New York's Working Mother of the Year Trailblazer Award.

References

External links 
 Robin Koval on Twitter
 Truth Initiative
 Truth

Publicis Groupe
American advertising executives
Syracuse University alumni
People from New York (state)
1955 births
Living people